Zacuto is an American company that creates, rents, and sells gear needed for filmmaking, videography, and photography. The company was founded in 2000. Located in the River North neighborhood of Chicago, Illinois, Zacuto manufactures its camera accessories in the United States.

Product Developers

Jens Bogenhegn
Bogenhegn studied at Columbia College Chicago as a film major. Since 1985, Bogenhegn has been a professional cameraman and has worked on numerous projects as a Steadicam owner/operator from 1988 through 1998. As a member of IATSE Local 600, Bogenhegn's union credits include: The Untouchables (TV), Wayne's World 2 and U.S. Marshals. His independent credits include: The Oprah Winfrey Show, Watch It and Cosmic Voyage (IMAX). In 1988, Bogenhegn began working with Steve Weiss as a director of photography and camera operator. Together, Bogenhegn and Weiss worked on over 600 productions together in the corporate, commercial and political video industries before starting Zacuto in 2000.

Steve Weiss
Weiss has created and worked in many niche markets like historical videos for Fortune 500 companies, video news releases, new product releases and interviews with CEOs and politicians. In 2000, Weiss formed Zacuto with Jens Bogehegn. Weiss and Bogenhegn have also produced numerous webisodic films and series at Zacuto. Their web series The Great Camera Shootout 2010 was the first web series to win an Emmy Award for excellence in informational programming.

Original programming
Zacuto produces original programming for entertaining and educating individuals in the video, film and photography industries. These videos include interviews with leaders of the film and photography industries on topics such as event videography, filmmaking, cinematography, directing, sound, lighting, documentary, DIY filmmaking and more. Zacuto's original programming has garnered Emmy nominations and awards (Midwest Chapter).

References

Companies based in Chicago
Technology companies established in 2000